Myint Myint Aye may refer to the following Burmese sportswomen:
 Myint Myint Aye (footballer) (born 1988)
 Myint Myint Aye (runner) (born 1977)